Cirrus cloud thinning (CCT) is a proposed form of climate engineering. Cirrus clouds are high cold ice that, like other clouds, both reflect sunlight and absorb warming infrared radiation. However, they differ from other types of clouds in that, on average, infrared absorption outweighs sunlight reflection, resulting in a net warming effect on the climate. Therefore, thinning or removing these clouds would reduce their heat trapping capacity, resulting in a cooling effect on Earth's climate. This could be a potential tool to reduce anthropogenic global warming. Cirrus cloud thinning is an alternative category of climate engineering, in addition to solar radiation management and greenhouse gas removal.

In 2021 the IPCC described CCT as a proposal "to reduce the amount of cirrus clouds by injecting ice nucleating substances in the upper troposphere." However it reported low confidence in the cooling effect of CCT, due to limited understanding of cirrus microphysics, its interaction with aerosols, and the complexity of seeding strategy. CCT may also increase global precipitation.

Basic principles 
Typical cirrus clouds may be susceptible to modification to reduce their lifetime and optical thickness, and hence their net positive radiative forcing (in contrast to the typical low, warm liquid clouds). Material to seed such modification could be delivered via drones or by aircraft. Scientists believe that cirrus clouds in the high latitude upper troposphere are formed by homogeneous freezing, resulting in large numbers of small ice crystals. If effective ice nuclei were introduced into this environment, the cirrus may instead form by heterogeneous freezing. If the concentration of ice nuclei is seeded such that the resulting cloud particle density is less than that for the natural case, the cloud particles should grow larger due to less water vapor competition and attain higher settling velocities. By seeding with aerosols, ice crystals could grow rapidly and deplete water vapor, suppress nucleation and any growth of ice crystals by homogeneous nucleation. The net effect would be a reduced optical thickness and a reduced cloud lifetime, allowing more infrared radiation to be emitted at the top of the atmosphere, as the ice particles sediment out. Less upper tropospheric water vapor and infrared radiation in the atmosphere would consequently cool the climate.

Bismuth tri-iodide (BiI3) has been proposed as the seeding material, as it is effective as ice nuclei for temperatures colder than -10 °C, non-toxic and relatively inexpensive compared to e.g. silver iodide. The seeding aerosols would need to be added regularly, as it would sediment out along with the large ice crystals.

Current research 

In contrast to solar radiation management techniques, which would be most effective during the day time at lower latitudes, cirrus cloud thinning would be most effective at high latitudes and high solar zenith angles, where the background concentrations of aerosol are low.

The cloud-aerosol-climate interactions important for cirrus cloud thinning are not well understood. Factors that related to the heterogeneous freezing process are uncertain, as ice growth kinetics are not well documented. Vertical velocities are essential for the activation of ice nuclei, but remain uncertain due to lack of observations. Heterogeneous freezing may already be common in cirrus, which could limit the cooling potential of the technique. There are significant uncertainties associated with not only ice nucleation processes in cirrus clouds and the fraction of nucleation that occurs via heterogeneous and homogeneous freezing, but also its representation in climate models. “Over-seeding” might lead to warming, as opposed to the desired cooling. Several studies assess the potential and viability of cirrus cloud thinning and the effectiveness of the technique remains a subject of debate.

Due to the lack of realistic representation of ice crystal nucleation in Earth system models, some studies have used a simplified representation of cirrus cloud thinning by increasing the terminal velocity of ice crystals below the homogeneous freezing threshold of about -38 °C.

Cirrus cloud formation may be effected by secondary organic aerosols, i.e. particles produced by natural plant life.

Some modelling of cirrus cloud seeding indicates significant reductions in climate damage due to  increase.

See also

 Solar radiation management
 Marine cloud brightening
 Cirrus clouds
 Climate engineering

References 

Planetary engineering
Climate engineering